The twelfth season of Let's Dance started on March 15, 2019 and ended on June 14, 2019. Daniel Hartwich and Victoria Swarovski returned as hosts. Joachim Llambi, Motsi Mabuse, and Jorge Gonzalez also returned as the judges.

Dancing Stars 2019 were Pascal Hens & Ekaterina Leonova.

Couples

Scoring chart

Red numbers indicates the lowest score for each week.
Green numbers indicates the highest score for each week.
 indicates the couple eliminated that week.
 indicates the returning couple that finished in the bottom two.
 indicates the couple which was immune from elimination.
 indicates the winning couple.
 indicates the runner-up couple.
 indicates the third-place couple.

Averages 
This table only counts for dances scored on a traditional 30-points scale.

Highest and lowest scoring performances 
The best and worst performances in each dance according to the judges' marks are as follows:

Couples' highest and lowest scoring dances
According to the traditional 30-point scale.

Weekly scores and songs

Launch show
For the third time there was a launch show in which each celebrity meets his partner. This show aired on 15 March 2019. In this first live show the couples then danced in groups and each couple got points by the judges and the viewers. At the end of the show the couple with the highest combined points was granted immunity from the first elimination.

Key
 Celebrity won immunity from the first elimination

The Team dances

Week 1
Running order

Week 2
Thema: 80's
Running order

Week 3
Running order

Week 4
Thema: 90's
Running order

Week 5
 The show aired on April 26 because of the Easter holidays.
Running order

Week 6
Thema: Love Songs
Musical guests: Davin Herbrüggen-"The River"
Running order

Week 7
Running order

Week 8
Thema: TV-Melodien
Running order

Week 9
Theme: Magic Moment
Running order

Week 10
Running order

Week 11: Semi-final
Running order

Week 12: Final
Running order

Dance chart
 Highest scoring dance
 Lowest scoring dance
 Was not scored (encore performance in the finale)
 The pair did not perform this week

References

External links
Official website

Let's Dance (German TV series)
2019 German television seasons